Lagelal-e Nurabad (also Romanized as Lāgelāl-e Nūrābād) is a village in Seyyedvaliyeddin Rural District, Sardasht District, Dezful County, Khuzestan Province, Iran. At the 2006 census, its population was 29, in 4 families.

References 

Populated places in Dezful County